The 1980–81 WHL season was the 15th season for the Western Hockey League.  Thirteen teams completed a 72-game season.  The Victoria Cougars won the President's Cup.

League notes
 The Spokane Flyers and Winnipeg Warriors joined the WHL as its 12th and 13th franchises.

Regular season

Final standings

Scoring leaders
Note: GP = Games played; G = Goals; A = Assists; Pts = Points; PIM = Penalties in minutes

1981 WHL Playoffs

First round
Regina defeated Brandon 4 games to 1
Calgary defeated Billings 4 games to 1
Lethbridge defeated Medicine Hat 4 games to 1
Spokane defeated New Westminster in 4th place tiebreaker game

Division semi-finals
Regina earned a bye
Calgary defeated Lethbridge 3 games to 1
Victoria defeated Spokane 4 games to 0
Portland defeated Seattle 4 games to 1

Division finals
 Calgary defeated Regina 4 games to 2
 Victoria defeated Portland 4 games to 0

WHL Championship
Victoria defeated Calgary 4 games to 3

All-Star game

On January 20, the WHL All-Stars defeated the Victoria Cougars 8–3 at Victoria, British Columbia with a crowd of 3,520.

WHL awards

All-Star Teams

See also
1981 Memorial Cup
1981 NHL Entry Draft
1980 in sports
1981 in sports

References

 whl.ca
 2005–06 WHL Guide

Western Hockey League seasons
WCHL
WHL